Pawan may refer to:

 Pawan (actor) (born 1971), Indian actor
 Joseph Lennox Pawan (born 1887), Trinidadian bacteriologist and virologist
 Pawan Kalyan (born 1971), Indian actor and director in Telugu cinema 
 Pawan Kumar (director) (born 1982), Indian film director, actor, producer, and screenwriter in Kannada cinema
 Pawan Kumar Chamling (born 1950), Chief Minister of the Indian state of Sikkim
 Operation Pawan, 1987

See also
 Pavan (disambiguation)